The R504 road is a regional road in Ireland which runs north-south from Birdhill to its junction with the R503 at Shower Cross, one kilometre west of the town of Newport, all in County Tipperary.  En route it passes through Clery's Cross and Barna Cross, and crosses over the M7 motorway.

See also
Roads in Ireland
National primary road
National secondary road

References
Roads Act 1993 (Classification of Regional Roads) Order 2006 – Department of Transport

Regional roads in the Republic of Ireland
Roads in County Tipperary